Pekař (feminine Pekařová) is a Czech surname. Pekár (feminine Pekárová) is a Slovak surname. In both languages the surname denotes "baker".

Notable people with the surname include:

 Harvey Pekar (1939–2010), American underground comic book writer, music critic and media personality
 Jaroslav Pekař (born 1944), Czech sports shooter
 Jonathan Pekar (born 1970), American producer, actor, comedian, director and artist
 Josef Pekař (1870–1937), Czech historian
 László Pekár (born 1993), Hungarian footballer
 Matúš Pekár (born 1984), Slovak footballer
 Solomon Isaakovich Pekar (1917–1985), Soviet theoretical physicist
 Štefan Pekár (born 1988), Slovak footballer

Czech-language surnames
Slovak-language surnames
Occupational surnames